Greatest Video Hits 2 is the second DVD of music videos from the English band, Queen. It was released in November 2003, and included video hits of the band from 1981 to 1989. It was at number one in UK, in its first week. It also peaked at number 1 in Ireland. In that same year the DVD was number 2 in Spain, and number 4 in Italy. It was certified 2 platinum awards in UK, platinum in France and Australia, gold in Germany, Spain, Poland and other countries.

It features an option for audio commentary from both Brian May and Roger Taylor on each music video, reflecting on their memories and opinions of each video.

Music videos from Innuendo were not included on the DVD.

Disc one
 A Kind of Magic (from A Kind of Magic, 1986)
 I Want It All (from The Miracle, 1989)
 Radio Ga Ga (from The Works, 1984)
 I Want to Break Free (from The Works, 1984)
 Breakthru (from The Miracle, 1989)
 Under Pressure (from Hot Space, 1982)
 Scandal (from The Miracle, 1989)
 Who Wants to Live Forever (from A Kind of Magic, 1986)
 The Miracle (from The Miracle, 1989)
 It's a Hard Life (from The Works, 1984)
 The Invisible Man (from The Miracle, 1989)
 Las Palabras de Amor (from Hot Space, 1982)
 Friends Will Be Friends (from A Kind of Magic, 1986)
 Body Language (from Hot Space, 1982)
 Hammer to Fall (from The Works, 1984)
 Princes of the Universe (from A Kind of Magic, 1986)
 One Vision (from A Kind of Magic, 1986)

Disc two

Hot Space section Volume 1
 Back Chat
 Calling All Girls
 Staying Power; live from Milton Keynes, 1982

Also there is an alternative version of "Who Wants To Live Forever". On the Hot Space menu, highlight the play all button and then press up, left, and right to see the Ian and Belinda version of the song for the British Bone Marrow Donor Appeal.

The Works section Volume 2
 Montreux Golden Rose Pop Festival
 Interviews, including one with Freddie Mercury.

A Kind of Magic section Volume 3
 Montreux Golden Rose Pop Festival
 Interviews
 One Vision documentary
 'Extended Vision' video

The Miracle section Volume 4
 Interviews
 'Making of The Miracle' documentary
 'Making of The Miracle Album Cover' documentary
 Bonus video: Who Wants to Live Forever for the Bone Marrow Donor Appeal

Audio
PCM Stereo
DTS 5.1 (for Disc 1 only and  those marked with an asterisk on Disc 2)
Commentary from Roger Taylor and Brian May on each Music Video.
 UK copies have a few seconds of introduction by Jonathan Ross dubbed at the end of Miracle Interviews by accident.

Charts and certifications

Charts

Certifications

References

Queen (band) video albums
Hollywood Records video albums